The Old Country is an album by Nat Adderley's Quintet recorded in 1990 and originally released on the Japanese Alfa label before being re-released on Enja Records.

Reception

The Penguin Guide to Jazz states the set "Genus and Drummond do a marvellous job ... and the two horns are well synchronised and brightly registered". In his review for AllMusic, Ron Wynn stated "Adderley has evidently found a soul mate in alto saxophonist Vince Herring, with whom he works once more on this 1990 date. Herring's voice has grown more impressive with each release, and he now offers more than just dazzling lines and phrases; he's constructing and completing confident statements".

Track listing
 "The Old Country" (Nat Adderley) – 6:47
 "Bohemia After Dark" (Oscar Pettiford) – 5:57
 "Jeannine" (Duke Pearson) – 9:32
 "Almost Always" (Vincent Herring) – 4:43
 "Love for Sale" (Cole Porter) – 5:45
 "One for Daddy-O" (Adderley) – 5:55
 "Stella by Starlight" (Victor Young, Ned Washington) – 6:40 	
 "The Chant" (Victor Feldman) – 5:41
 "Nippon Soul" (Cannonball Adderley) – 6:23

Personnel
Nat Adderley – cornet
Vincent Herring – alto saxophone
Rob Bargad – piano
James Genus – bass
Billy Drummond – drums

References

1991 albums
Nat Adderley albums
Alfa Records albums
Enja Records albums